This is a list of wind farms in Queensland, Australia. To be included on the list a wind farm must have a capacity of 10 MW or greater.

As of 2022, Queensland has 3 operating wind farms with a total installed capacity of about 645 MW.

Operational

Projects

See also 

 List of power stations in Queensland
 Wind power in Australia

References

External links
 Wind farms in Queensland: Wind in the Bush
 Qld Govt criticised for selling wind farms

 
Queensland
Wind farms